Qiu Bo (born 31 January 1993) is a Chinese diver. He won the silver medal in the 10 metre platform event at the 2012 Summer Olympics. He is a four-time world champion at the World Aquatics Championships, winning the gold medal three times in the 10m platform event, consecutively in 2011, 2013 and 2015, and winning the gold medal in the synchronized 10m event in 2011.

Early life 
Born in Neijiang, Sichuan, Qiu started diving at the age of 7. His diving career began when a coach spotted him bouncing on a trampoline and drafted him into a state sports school. In 2002, Qiu considered quitting the sport when his family could no longer afford his schooling. His coach convinced him to continue and used his own money to finance Qiu's development.

Diving career 
Qiu is part of the China National Diving Team since 2008. During the 2010 Summer Youth Olympics, he won a pair of gold medals in both the 3m springboard and 10m platform competitions. In the 2011 FINA Diving World Series, Qiu achieved his career high with a historic score of 609.20 in the 10m platform event, where he received 25 perfect 10s from the judges. He also became the first diver in history to surpass 600 points in an international competition since the regulation was introduced. Later that year, FINA named Qiu as the Male Diver of the Year. In the 2015 FINA Diving World Series, Qiu broke his previous record and achieved a new personal best with a score of 612.75.

Olympic Games 
Qiu competed in the 2012 Summer Olympics and received a silver medal in the 10 metre platform competition. Despite ranking first in the preliminary round and the semifinals, he ultimately placed second behind American diver David Boudia during the finals. His final score of 566.85 was just 1.8 points behind Boudia's 568.65.

Four years later, Qiu competed in the 2016 Summer Olympics in the 10 metre platform competition. Despite ranking second in the preliminary round and the semifinals, he had misses in two of his dives and ultimately placed sixth behind Chinese diver Chen Aisen in the finals. Qiu accumulated a final score of 488.20, including a third dive that received 10s from all seven judges.

World Championships 
Qiu rose to prominence during the 2009 World Aquatics Championships, where he won a silver medal in the 10 metre platform event. In 2011, he won gold medals in both the 10m individual event and the 10m synchro event with his partner Huo Liang. In 2013, Qiu continued his victorious streak by winning another gold medal in the 10m platform competition. Two years later, he repeated his success and won his third consecutive gold medal during the 2015 World Aquatics Championships. Qiu and American diver Greg Louganis are the only men to win the world championship title at this event for three successive times. In 2017, Qiu only participated in the mixed team event, where he came in sixth place.

Diving World Cup 
Qiu competed in the 10m platform event at the FINA Diving World Cup on four occasions, achieving a podium finish every time. He won a gold medal in the years 2012 and 2016. He also won a silver medal in 2014, along with a bronze medal in 2010.

In 2018, Qiu competed in the mixed team event, where he won the gold medal with Chen Yiwen.

Competitive history

References

External links 
 FINA profile
 IOC profile
 Olympedia profile

 

1993 births
Chinese male divers
Living people
Divers at the 2010 Summer Youth Olympics
Divers at the 2012 Summer Olympics
Divers at the 2016 Summer Olympics
Olympic divers of China
Olympic silver medalists for China
Olympic medalists in diving
Sportspeople from Sichuan
People from Neijiang
Medalists at the 2012 Summer Olympics
Asian Games medalists in diving
Divers at the 2014 Asian Games
Divers at the 2018 Asian Games
Medalists at the 2014 Asian Games
Medalists at the 2018 Asian Games
World Aquatics Championships medalists in diving
Asian Games gold medalists for China
Asian Games silver medalists for China
Youth Olympic gold medalists for China
20th-century Chinese people
21st-century Chinese people